Iván Rodrigo Fassione Gómez (born 27 December 1983) is an Argentine professional footballer who plays as a defender for Cañuelas.

Career
Fassione played for Almirante Brown's youth, before signing for San Lorenzo's academy. In early 2005, Fassione was loaned to Linares of Spain's Segunda División B. He made his bow in a 1–0 win over Arenas on 6 February, with a further five appearances following in 2004–05 as they placed eleventh in Group IV. Fassione returned to San Lorenzo in June 2005, though was subsequently released. Fassione went back to Spanish football in 2006, signing with third tier team Sabadell - via a trial with Villanueva. He was sent off in his second match versus Osasuna B, on the way to five appearances as they suffered relegation.

Fassione spent the subsequent 2006–07 Tercera División campaign with Torredonjimeno. One goal in thirty-one games occurred. A return to the country's third tier was completed in 2007, as he agreed terms with Alcalá. Having been relegated with the Alcalá de Guadaíra outfit, Fassione made a move to Jerez in 2008. He netted once for the club throughout the 2008–09 campaign. 2010 saw Fassione return to his homeland with Torneo Argentino A's Gimnasia y Esgrima. Subsequent stints with Deportivo Laferrere, Boca Río Gallegos and Sportivo Italiano came from 2011. Fassione had a spell with Brown to end 2014.

In January 2015, Fassione joined Primera B Metropolitana side Almirante Brown. Fifty-two appearances then arrived in all competitions across his opening four campaigns. After four years there, Fassione left in July 2019 to Primera C Metropolitana's Cañuelas.

Career statistics
.

Honours
Sportivo Italiano
Primera C Metropolitana: 2013–14

References

External links

1983 births
Living people
People from La Matanza Partido
Argentine footballers
Association football defenders
Argentine expatriate footballers
Expatriate footballers in Spain
Argentine expatriate sportspeople in Spain
Segunda División B players
Tercera División players
Primera C Metropolitana players
Torneo Argentino B players
Primera B Metropolitana players
San Lorenzo de Almagro footballers
CD Linares players
CE Sabadell FC footballers
Torredonjimeno CF players
CD Alcalá players
Jerez CF players
Gimnasia y Esgrima de Concepción del Uruguay footballers
Deportivo Laferrere footballers
Boca Río Gallegos footballers
Sportivo Italiano footballers
Club Atlético Brown footballers
Club Almirante Brown footballers
Cañuelas footballers
Sportspeople from Buenos Aires Province